The men's 20 kilometres walk event at the 2006 African Championships in Athletics was held in Bambous, Mauritius on August 13.

Results

References
Results 

2006 African Championships in Athletics
Racewalking at the African Championships in Athletics